is a Japanese manga artist, born in Tokyo. 

His debut pen name was Kazuto Yamamoto (. His name in rōmaji is misspelled as "Senno Naiff" in the books published by Akita Shoten and Bunkasha.

Biography 
A former assistant to Leiji Matsumoto and Miyako Maki, he became an assistant at the same time as Kaoru Shintani, who also was assistant to Matsumoto.  Before his commercial debut, he was active as a doujinshi artist, and as of 2020, he still active in the scene.

He made his debut in a commercial magazine in 1981 with "Yukihime" in the first issue of "Lemon People" (published by Amatoria). From the time of his debut to the early years of his career, he worked mainly in adult-oriented manga magazines, and since 1984, he has also written for general magazines, shōnen and shōjo (boys' and girls') magazines. His works cover a wide range of genres, including horror, science fiction, fantasy, and manga comicalizations (adaptations of famous fairy tales and novels).

His wife is the mangaka and illustrator Rutoto Nekoi. Most of the jacket illustrations for Psydoll, a post-new wave band in which Nekoi is a vocalist, are drawn by him.

Style 
Senno Knife's main style since his debut has been a detailed and aesthetic style of drawing and a unique and enigmatic storyline. His works are often fantastical, especially with themes of sex, death, demons, dolls, TSF (transgender fiction), and yuri, but some of his works also include gag and parody elements, giving his style a wide range.

Selected works 

 1984 - Labyrinth Circus 
 1989  - Valkyr 
 1993 - Bizzarian
 1993 - Sepia  
 1994 - Eden
 1995 - Shōjo Pandora
 1996 - Sister
 1997- Shitaro-kun
 2000 - Kamakiri Onna (Mantis Woman)
 Classical masterpieces collection (古典名作集 Koten meisaku shu): 
 Sade (2003) 
 Tempest (2005) 
 Decameron (2006) 
 Faust (2007)
 Sade 2 (2008)
Several of Senno Knife's works  (Valkyr, Bizzarian, Dark Dimension Zero, Sepia, and Eden) were published in English by Studio Ironcat.

Video game illustrations 
 1988- Senno Knife's Demon Girl Mansion (Senno Knife no Mahou Shoujokan; 千之ナイフの魔少女館)  (PC-8801/MSX2) (I-cell) 
 1989- Senno Knife: Demon Girls in the Labyrinth  (Senno Knife no Meikyuu no Mashoujo; 千之ナイフ　迷宮の魔少女) (PC-8801 / PC-9801 / MSX2) (I-cell) 
 1998 -End Sector (PlayStation; some card illustrations)

References

External links 
 Senno Knife's blog on Ameba
 Tyrellsha（Senno Knife's doujinshi publisher）

Hentai manga artists
Living people
1960 births
Manga artists from Tokyo
Leiji Matsumoto